Yitzhak Issachar Goldknopf (born 30 October 1950) is an Israeli politician currently serving as the Ministry of Construction (Israel) and the leader of Agudat Yisrael. Goldknopf is the leader of the United Torah Judaism party, following the resignation of Yaakov Litzman. He previously served as a member of the Jerusalem City Council.

Biography 
Goldknopf was born in Jerusalem in 1950 to Malka and Yehuda, a follower of the Ger Hasidic dynasty.

Goldknopf is a member of Agudat Yisrael's national committee. He was elected to the Jerusalem City Council in 2003. Goldknopf is CEO of the Beit Yaakov and Beit Petahia kindergartens and daycare centers, which he inherited from his father. In June 2022, Yaakov Aryeh Alter, Rebbe of the Ger dynasty, appointed Goldknopf to replace Yaakov Litzman as leader of Agudat Yisrael. Goldknopf was additionally assigned the first spot on the party's electoral list ahead of the 2022 election. Following the election, he became a Member of the 25th Knesset on November 15th, resigning on 6 January 2023 as part of the Norwegian Law. On 29 December 2022, Goldknopf became the Minister of Housing and Construction.

Goldknopf is well known in the religious community because of his position as chair of the "Committee for the Sanctity of the Sabbath". The committee has fought for restrictions in the Israeli public space, including a campaign that forced El Al to stop flying on Saturdays. He has recently intervened in a highly publicized spat between the Gur leadership and Knesset member Meir Porush, who accused it of undermining his bid for Mayor of Jerusalem.

Personal life 
Goldknopf is married, and has ten children.

References 

1950 births
Living people
Agudat Yisrael politicians
People from Jerusalem
Members of the 25th Knesset (2022–)
Rabbinic members of the Knesset